La Patera (Spanish for "The Place of Ducks") is an unincorporated community in Santa Barbara County, in the U.S. state of California.

References

Unincorporated communities in Santa Barbara County, California
Unincorporated communities in California